Smartwings, a.s. (formerly Travel Service, a.s.) is a low-cost leisure Czech airline, with its head office on the property of Václav Havel Airport Prague in Ruzyně, 6th district, Prague. It is the biggest airline in the Czech Republic and it operates scheduled and chartered flights, mainly to leisure destinations, and also wet and dry leases its aircraft to other airlines. It also owns 30% of Czech Airlines, and has subsidiaries in Poland, Hungary and Slovakia.

History

Smartwings was founded in 1997 originally under the name Travel Service and focused on operating charter flights mainly for Czech tour operators. Its first airplane was a Tupolev Tu-154M. In the year 2000 Travel Service received its first Boeing 737-400. Since then the airline has been operating a mainly Boeing fleet.

In 2004, Travel Service launched its low-cost brand Smartwings. Travel Service leased two Boeing 737-500s from Lufthansa which were primary intended for Smartwings flights. Both aircraft were painted in the new Smartwings livery. Former Czech president Václav Klaus attended the opening ceremony, which was held on May 1, 2004.

In 2007, the company carried 2.2 million passengers, and a year later about 2.3 million passengers. In 2014, it carried 4.3 million passengers, about 1.2 of them on regular flights under the brand name Smartwings.

On 18 September 2007, the Icelandair Group acquired 50% stake in the carrier, and purchased further shares to bring its holding up to 80% by April 2008. In December 2008 it reduced its holding to 66% by selling shares to the other shareholders, Unimex. In 2009 their stake was further diluted to 50.1% through a new share issue; they also sold a portion of their stake to fellow owners, reducing their holding to 30% In 2009 Icelandair spun its 30% stake in Travel Service into a new company, which was taken over by Icelandair's creditors. Chinese investment group CEFC China Energy now holds a 49.9% stake in Travel Service.

Travel Service owned 98 percent of Czech Airlines; it bought 64% from Prisko and Korean Air in 2017. Before, it owned 34%, bought in 2014. After Czech Airlines went through business restructuring Smartwings retained 30% of the company.

In 2013, Travel Service has cancelled their order for Boeing 787 Dreamliner and ordered Boeing 737 Max 8.

In October 2017 it was announced that Travel Service planned to transfer its branding from an airline to a holding company, and would move all of its operations under the Smartwings brand. In 2018, it was announced that the Travel Service livery would be replaced by the Smartwings livery. Also in that year, deliveries of the new Boeing 737 MAX began.

Travel Service was renamed to Smartwings, the name of its former low-cost subsidiary, in December 2018.

In March 2019, Smartwings announced plans to create a German subsidiary by late 2019, and to transition its Czech Airlines subsidiary to an all Boeing 737 fleet. However, as of 2022 these plans have not materialized, and Czech Airlines maintains its all-Airbus fleet.

In February 2021, Smartwings announced the return of their stored Boeing 737 MAX to service by the end of the month, the first European airline to do so.

Business figures

Destinations

Fleet

Current fleet

 the Smartwings fleet consists of the following aircraft:

Business jet fleet

Smartwings also operates business jets that are available for private air charter. As of January 2017 the business jet fleet consists of the following aircraft:

Previously operated
 Airbus A320-200
 Boeing 737-400
 Boeing 737-500
 Boeing 757-200
 Boeing 767-300ER
 Tupolev Tu-154M

Accidents and incidents

 On 22 August 2019, a Smartwings Boeing 737-800 (Registration: OK-TVO) operated flight QS-1125 from Samos, Greece to Prague, Czech Republic with 170 passengers on board. The aircraft was flying at 36,000 feet over the Aegean Sea about 100 nm northeast of Athens, Greece when it had an engine failure. The crew drifted the aircraft down to 24,000 without informing ATC of the emergency, only informing them of a "technical malfunction". Instead of, as per engine failure procedure, landing at the nearest suitable airport, the flight crew carried on to Prague at that level for a landing without further incident about 2 hours and 20 minutes later. The Czech Civil Aviation Authority (CAA) confirmed that an investigation had been launched into the incident: "we have decided to launch an investigation as the procedure followed doesn't seem standard." Following the incident, Prague police launched an investigation into the flight on suspicion of endangering the public due to negligence, and a Smartwings internal investigation demoted the captain from his post as head of flight operations. In July 2020, the CAA released the final report by the Air Accidents Investigation Institute (AAII), which blamed the incident on the captain failing to follow mandatory procedures, including landing at the nearest possible diversion airport after an engine failure. As of July 2020 the captain Pavel Veselý continues to pilot Smartwings flights.

References

External links

Official website

Airlines of the Czech Republic
Airlines established in 1997
Airlines for Europe
Charter airlines
Companies based in Prague
Czech brands
Czech companies established in 1997